The lytavry (also tulumbasy) are a bass drum similar to the kettle drums or timpani used in Ukraine. 
The lytavry were used in Ukraine from the times of the Cossacks, and probably earlier as a signaling device to announce meetings and enemy attacks. They are used in Ukrainian folk instrument orchestras.

Hornbostel-Sachs classification number 211.11

See also
Ukrainian folk music

Sources
Cherkaskyi, L. - Ukrainski narodni muzychni instrumenty // Tekhnika, Kyiv, Ukraine, 2003 - 262 pages. 

Ukrainian musical instruments
Drums